Delaware is an unincorporated community in eastern Shannon County, in the U.S. state of Missouri. The community is located on Mahans Creek approximately four miles southwest of Eminence.

History
A post office called Delaware was established in 1923, and remained in operation until 1941. The community was named after the Delaware Indians.

References

Unincorporated communities in Shannon County, Missouri
Unincorporated communities in Missouri